Cryptology Research Society of India (CRSI) is a scientific organisation that supports research in India on cryptography, data security, and related fields. The organisation was founded in 2001. CRSI organises workshops and conferences about cryptology.

Activities 

CRSI organises several annual workshops and conferences about cryptology. More specifically, CRSI organises the annual events INDOCRYPT, an international conference on cryptography, 
and the Indian national workshop on cryptology. It also arranged the International Association for Cryptologic Research's (IACR) workshop on Fast Software Encryption in 2003 at New Delhi and IACR's conference Asiacrypt in 2013 and in 2005 at Chennai.

Organizational structure 
The main office of CRSI is located in Kolkata. CRSI was founded by the current general secretary Prof. Bimal Roy, former Director of the Indian Statistical Institute. Padmashree R. Balasubramaniam, is the organization's president.

References

External links 
 
 www.crsind.com - former official website (now dead)

Cryptography organizations
Scientific organisations based in India